Sean White may refer to:

Sean White (baseball) (born 1981), American baseball player
Sean White (American football) (born 1995), American football quarterback
Sean White (rugby union) (born 1988), Canadian rugby player
Seán White, Irish hurler
Seán White (Gaelic footballer) (born 1995), Irish Gaelic footballer

See also
Shaun White (born 1986), American snowboarder and skateboarder
Shun White (born 1985), American football wide receiver
Sean Wight (1964–2011), Australian rules footballer
Sean Whyte (disambiguation)